Alessandra Corine Ambrósio (born 11 April 1981) is a Brazilian model. She is known for her work with Victoria's Secret and was chosen as the first spokesmodel for the company's PINK line. She was a Victoria's Secret Angel from 2004 to 2017 and has modeled for fashion houses such as Christian Dior, Armani, Ralph Lauren, and Next.

Ambrosio was ranked number five on Forbes list of the highest-paid models, estimated to have earned $6.6 million every year. She is often cited by the popular media as one of the world's sexiest women. As an "Angel", she was chosen as one of People annual "100 Most Beautiful People in the World" in May 2007. Ambrosio is considered one of the icons in the fashion industry.

Early life
Alessandra Corine Ambrósio was born on 11 April 1981 in Erechim, Rio Grande do Sul, Brazil, the daughter of Lucilda and Luiz Ambrósio. She has a younger sister named Aline. She is of Italian and Polish descent. Her paternal grandmother, Joana Eugênia Groch, was an immigrant from Poland, who arrived in Brazil as a child in 1929. She died in 2017, at age 93.

She enrolled at a modeling class at the age of 12, and at the age of 14, she was one of 20 finalists for the 1995 Elite Model Look national competition for Brazil. Ambrosio was always insecure about her large ears, and at the age of 11, she had cosmetic surgery to have her ears pinned back, though two years later she suffered complications.

Career

Modeling
When Ambrosio was 12 years old, she partook in modeling classes and then began modeling for Dilson Stein at age 15. Competing in Brazil's Elite Model Look competition started her modeling career in earnest. Her first notable modeling job was shooting the cover of Brazilian Elle magazine. Elite passed along some of her Polaroids to Guess which led her booking the Millennium GUESS? campaign.

Ambrosio has since appeared in advertising campaigns for Gucci, Dolce & Gabbana, Calvin Klein, Oscar de la Renta, Christian Dior, Escada, Fendi, Giorgio Armani, Guess, Emporio Armani, Moschino, Gap, Hugo Boss, Ralph Lauren, Saks Fifth Avenue, Macy's, Revlon, and the Pirelli Calendar. She has walked the catwalks for designers such as Prada, Chanel, Dolce & Gabbana, Givenchy, Christian Lacroix, Bottega Veneta, Escada, Tommy Hilfiger, Christian Dior, Marc Jacobs, Louis Vuitton, Balmain, Ralph Lauren, Halston, Vivienne Westwood, Giles Deacon, Kenzo, Emanuel Ungaro, Philipp Plein, and Oscar de la Renta. She has appeared in numerous international magazine covers, including Cosmopolitan, Elle, GQ, Harper's Bazaar, Marie Claire, Ocean Drive, Vogue, and was the only model to appear on the cover of Glamour in the United States in 2006.

In 2004, Ambrosio launched her line of swimwear called Alessandra Ambrosio by Sais, a division of Rosa Chá. It sold 10,000 units in its first month on the market. Ambrosio was the face for the UK company Next and starred in their first television campaign in 12 years.

In 2006, Ambrosio appeared on The Tyra Banks Show and said that the ear surgery she had as a kid was a bad experience and has discouraged her from ever getting plastic surgery again.

On the July 2009 cover of Marie Claire, Ambrosio appeared in a spread with Sacha Baron Cohen to promote Baron Cohen's 2009 film Brüno.

Ambrosio became the face of Brazilian sportswear brand Colcci costarring with Ashton Kutcher in a denim ad. She was ranked No. 5 on Forbes The World's Top-Earning Models list, with an estimated earnings of $5 million over 2010–2011.
In October 2011, Ambrosio became Vogues blogger, commenting on her wardrobe by posting one photo of herself each day for a month.
On 12 August 2012, she appeared in the 2012 Summer Olympics closing ceremony representing the Brazilian fashion tradition on the handover segment to Rio de Janeiro City.

In spring 2014, Ambrosio launched her own fashion and lifestyle brand named Ále by Alessandra  in a collaboration with American retailer Cherokee. The line features casual wear to formal attire and is aimed at females between 18 and 35 years old. The apparel line was first shown by Southern California-based retailer Planet Blue. For this brand, Ambrosio used her intellectual property company, Silver Sunrise LLC, which works with Cherokee as its global licensing agent.

Ambrosio appeared in the February 2016 issue of GQ alongside Portuguese footballer Cristiano Ronaldo.

Ambrosio was chosen by NBC alongside fellow Brazilian model Adriana Lima as the channel's food and culture correspondents for the 2016 Summer Olympics.

Victoria's Secret
By 2006, Ambrosio was selected as the first spokesmodel for the Victoria's Secret "PINK" line. In 2005, she walked the Victoria's Secret Fashion Show runway wearing lingerie made entirely out of candy. In the 2008 edition of the Fashion Show, she walked the runway three months after giving birth to her first child, and opened the show the following year in 2009. The 2011 show saw her wearing the heaviest wings ever made for the show while pregnant with her second child.

In 2012, Ambrosio was chosen to wear the "Fantasy Bra". The Floral Fantasy Bra, crafted by London Jewellers featured amethysts, rubies, sapphires, and diamonds all set in rose and yellow gold and adorned with more than 5,200 precious stones. In 2014, she wore the Dream Fantasy Bra, alongside fellow model Adriana Lima. Both of the bras cost $2.5 million each.

After the Victoria's Secret Fashion Show 2017, Alessandra posted on her Instagram that she will be retiring after "17 Victoria's Secret Fashion Shows".

Television and film appearances
Ambrosio has made several television appearances, notably a cameo as herself on HBO's Entourage; The Late Late Show with Craig Kilborn;
Late Night with Conan O'Brien; A guest judge on Project Runway Season 2: Team Lingerie and twice on The Tyra Banks Show. She also appeared on America's Next Top Model in the series' 20th cycle.

In 2006, she had a cameo in the box-office hit film Casino Royale, appearing briefly as Tennis Girl #1. Ambrosio guest-starred on the How I Met Your Mother episode "The Yips" on 26 November 2007 with her fellow Victoria's Secret Angels Adriana Lima, Selita Ebanks, Marisa Miller, Miranda Kerr, and Heidi Klum. She also made a cameo appearance during the New Girl episode "Prince".

Ambrosio made her acting debut in the Brazilian telenovela Verdades Secretas, which premiered on Rede Globo on 8 June 2015, playing the role of former top model Samia. She appeared as herself in the 2016 film, Teenage Mutant Ninja Turtles: Out of the Shadows.

Personal life

Ambrosio became engaged to American businessman Jamie Mazur, founder of RE/DONE jeans, in 2008. They have two children: a daughter (b. 2008) and a son (b. 2012). Ambrosio announced on 27 March 2018 that she and Mazur had split.

Ambrosio serves as an ambassador for the National Multiple Sclerosis Society.

In March 2019, Alessandra launched her beachwear brand, GAL Floripa, in partnership with her sister, Aline Ambrósio, and her childhood friend, Gisele Cória.

In November 2020, Ambrosio revealed that she had acquired American citizenship.

Filmography

Film

Television

Music videos

References

External links

Alessandra Ambrosio at The Fashion Styles

1981 births
Living people
Brazilian emigrants to the United States
Brazilian female models
Brazilian people of Italian descent
Brazilian people of Polish descent
Naturalized citizens of the United States
People from Erechim
People from Florianópolis
Victoria's Secret Angels